The 45th Newfoundland and Labrador House of Assembly began on November 12, 2003, with the swearing in of Members. The Premier and Executive Council had been sworn in on November 6, 2003. The Progressive Conservative government led by Danny Williams was elected with a victory over the Liberal Party. The Liberal and New Democratic Party (NDP) opposition was greatly decreased from what it was after the 1999 election.

Danny Williams was the Premier during this General Assembly.

Timeline
 November 6, 2003 – Danny Williams is sworn in as Newfoundland and Labrador's 9th Premier.
 November 6, 2003 – Danny Williams' Cabinet Ministers are sworn in, to serve in Newfoundland and Labrador's new government.
 December 23, 2004 – Williams ordered all Canadian flags removed from provincial buildings in reply to a dispute with then-Prime Minister of Canada Paul Martin over his desire to shield Newfoundland and Labrador's offshore oil revenues from the calculation of its fiscal capacity, the basis for calculating equalization payments which redistribute wealth to poorer provinces.
 May 30, 2005 – Liberal Leader Roger Grimes resigns as Member of the House of Assembly (MHA) and Opposition Leader. His successor as MHA is Progressive Conservative, Clayton Forsey.
 May 30, 2005 – Gerry Reid, Liberal MHA, is named interim leader of the Newfoundland and Labrador Liberal Party, and Interim Opposition Leader.
 February 6, 2006 – Jim Bennett is acclaimed as leader of the Liberal Party of Newfoundland and Labrador.
 February 21, 2006 – Fabian Manning resigns as a Provincial Cabinet Minister and MHA. His successor is Progressive Conservative, Felix Collins.
 May 29, 2006 – Jim Bennett resigns as Liberal leader and Gerry Reid is chosen to serve as leader of the party.
 June 21, 2006 – Auditor General John Noseworthy's investigations into spending at the house of assembly, leads to the discovery of a Legislative spending scandal.
 November 1, 2006 – Jack Harris resigns as a Newfoundland and Labrador New Democratic Party Leader, and MHA. His successor as New Democrat Leader and MHA is social activist, Lorraine Michael.
 February 8, 2007 – Loyola Sullivan resigns as a MHA for Ferryland. Her successor is Progressive Conservative, Keith Hutchings.
 February 8, 2007 – Ed Byrne resigns as a MHA for Kilbride. His successor is Progressive Conservative, John Dinn.
 February 8, 2007 – Jim Hodder resigns as a MHA for Port au Port. His successor is Progressive Conservative, Tony Cornect.
 February 13, 2007 – Kathy Goudie resigns as a MHA for Humber Valley. Her successor is Liberal, Dwight Ball.
 February 13, 2007 – Randy Collins resigns as a MHA for Labrador West. His successor is Progressive Conservative, Jim Baker.
 February 13, 2007 – Wally Andersen, resigns as MHA for Torngat Mountains before the 2007 general election, after being charged with fraud. A by-election was never called and the district's seat remained vacant until the 2007 general election.

Party standings

After the 2003 general election

Going into the 2007 general election

Members (MHAs)

References

45